The 2012 NCAA Division I baseball tournament began on Friday, June 1, 2012 as part of the 2012 NCAA Division I baseball season.  The 64 team double elimination tournament concluded with the 2012 College World Series in Omaha, Nebraska, starting on June 15 and ending on June 25.

The 64 NCAA Division I college baseball teams were selected out of an eligible 297 teams. Thirty teams were awarded an automatic bid as champions of their conferences, and 34 teams were selected at-large by the NCAA Division I Baseball Committee.

Bids

Automatic bids

Conference champions from 30 Division I conferences earned automatic bids to regionals.  The remaining 34 spots were awarded to schools as at-large invitees.

By conference

National seeds
These eight teams would automatically host a Super Regional had they advanced to that round. Only North Carolina failed to advance out of its regional.

Bold indicates CWS participant.

 Florida
 UCLA
 Florida State
 Baylor
 Oregon
 North Carolina
 LSU
 South Carolina

Regionals and Super Regionals
Bold indicates winner. * indicates extra innings.

Gainesville Super Regional

Columbia Super Regional

Los Angeles Super Regional

Baton Rouge Super Regional

Tucson Super Regional

Tallahassee Super Regional

Eugene Super Regional
†Purdue hosted at the U.S. Steel Yard in Gary, Indiana, due to the construction delays of the Boilermaker's new stadium, Alexander Field.

Waco Super Regional

College World Series

Participants

Bracket
Seeds listed below indicate national seeds only.

Championship Series

Game 1

Game 2

All-Tournament Team
The following players were members of the College World Series All-Tournament Team.

Final standings
Seeds listed below indicate national seeds only

 # denotes national seed

Record by conference

The columns RF, SR, WS, NS, CS, and NC respectively stand for the Regional Finals, Super Regionals, College World Series, National Semifinals, Championship Series, and National Champion.

Tournament notes

Round 1
Florida's Jonathon Crawford threw a no-hitter against Bethune-Cookman, the seventh no-hitter in NCAA tournament history and the first since 1991.
Kent State defeated Kentucky in 21 innings, the second longest game in NCAA tournament history.
Baylor lost to Oral Roberts, the first national seed to lose their round one game since Florida State and Georgia both did so in 2008. Both Georgia and Florida State went on to make the College World Series, with Georgia losing in the championship series.

Round 2
Miami (FL) became the first #1 seed to go 0–2 in Regional play since San Diego in 2007.

Regional Finals
Arizona became the first team ever to score at least 15 runs in every Regional game. They were the first team since Arkansas in 2009 to score 10 or more runs in every Regional game.
Stony Brook became the third #4 seed ever to win a Regional, joining Missouri in 2006 and Fresno State in 2008.

Super Regionals
Kent State, Oregon, St. John's, and Stony Brook all appeared in the Super Regionals for the first time.
LSU lost a Super Regional in Baton Rouge for the first time (had won previous five).
Florida State scored 35 runs in two games against Stanford, tied with LSU (2008) for the most runs in a Super Regional and the most in a 2-game Super Regional (previous record was 26).

College World Series

Stony Brook was the first College World Series participant from the America East Conference and is the first from New York since St. John's in 1980.
Kent State was the first MAC team to make the world series since 1976.
No school from Texas made the College World Series for the first time since 2001.
 This is the 20th consecutive year that the SEC has fielded at least one team in the College World Series.
 This is the 5th consecutive year that the SEC has fielded at least one team in the Championship Series.
 South Carolina becomes the first team since the '96, '97, '98 LSU Tigers to return to Omaha with a chance to defend their back-to-back Championships. Southern California is the only program in CWS history to win three consecutive CWS titles, or more, (1970–1974),(5).
 South Carolina entered the World Series riding two significant postseason winning streaks.
 Longest College World Series winning streak (10 CWS games) in NCAA history.
 Longest post-season winning streak (20 games) in NCAA history. (This streak includes, Regional, Super Regional and College World Series games, and also consists of six one run wins and four games that required extra innings.)
 Florida is making a third consecutive appearance in the College World Series for the first time in team history. Fellow 2012 CWS participants Florida State ('94,'95,'96 & '98,99,'00), Arizona ('58,'59,'60), Oregon State (05,06,07) and South Carolina ('02,'03,'04 & '10,'11,'12) have all made three consecutive appearances.
 The Game 4 match-up between No. 1 seed Florida and No. 8 seed South Carolina marks the first opening-round rematch of the previous season's Championship Game since the 1960 series when Arizona faced, and defeated, the 1959 Champions from Oklahoma State.
 This is the first appearance by Kent State or Stony Brook in the College World Series.
 Stony Brook is the second team since 1999 to be seeded fourth in a regional and advance to the College World Series (Fresno State won 2008 CWS).
 Arizona pitcher Konner Wade became the first pitcher to throw a complete game shutout without a walk in a College World Series game since 1972.
 For the first time since the tournament expanded to 64 teams in 1999, neither team that started 2–0 in the CWS was a national seed. (Arizona and Arkansas)
 As a result of the 20 June 2012 Game 10 rain delay, South Carolina will become the first team, since Georgia did so in 1987, to play all or part of two games on the same calendar day at the CWS when they face Arkansas in the night game (Game 12) on the 21st. The last team to play two full games, in the College World Series, on the same day was Michigan on 2 June 1980.
 With the 2–0 win over Arkansas in game 12, South Carolina becomes the first team since 1952 (Holy Cross)(60 years) to win two games in the College World Series on the same day.

CWS records tied or broken
 With the Game Four win over No. 1 seed Florida, the No. 8 seed South Carolina Gamecocks extend their NCAA record-setting postseason win streak to 21 consecutive games and their College World Series record-setting consecutive win streak to 11. (Both streaks came to an end in game Eight.)
 With the 4–1 win over Kent State in game 10, South Carolina's Michael Roth becomes the College World Series' all-time leader in Most Innings Pitched, with 53 2/3rd over three years. Roth also tied the record for Most CWS Starts with his 7th, and he tied the record for most CWS Wins all-time with a 4–0 CWS record. Additionally, Roth ties the record with Most Years With Wins (3).
 Arizona becomes the first CWS team to hit two home runs in an inning at TD Ameritrade Park after Rob Refsnyder and Bobby Brown hit home runs in the fourth inning of Game 11 against Florida State. In the same game, Florida State uses eight different pitchers, tying a CWS record.
 With the 3–2 win over Arkansas in game 13, South Carolina's Matt Price sets a new College World Series Most Wins record with 5.
 Arizona becomes only the second team after South Carolina the previous year to go a perfect 10–0 in the postseason.

Media coverage

Radio
NRG Media, in conjunction with the Dial Global Sports/NCAA Radio Network provided nationwide radio coverage of the College World Series. Kevin Kugler and John Bishop called all games leading up to the Championship Series. It would be the first time John Bishop would call College World Series games for Dial Global Sports. The championship series would be called by Kugler and Scott Graham.

Selection shows
The NCAA Division I Road to Omaha Selection Show aired on ESPN on May 28, 2012.

Competition
Regionals:
The Columbia and Tucson Regionals were broadcast on ESPNU and ESPN3.
The College Station, Gainesville, Palo Alto and Tallahassee Regionals were broadcast on ESPN3.
The Baton Rouge Regional was broadcast on Comcast SportsNet Northwest, Cox Sports Television, CSS.
Purdue's games at the Gary Regional were broadcast on Big Ten Network. Games in that regional not involving Purdue were not televised at all.
All games during the Super Regionals and the College World Series aired on the ESPN Networks (ESPN, ESPN2, ESPNU, and ESPN3).

Broadcast assignments

Super Regionals
Steve Berthiaume & Doug Glanville - Baton Rouge, Louisiana
Justin Kutcher & Jay Payton - Gainesville, Florida
Carter Blackburn, Randy Flores & Mike Rooney - Tucson, Arizona
Dave Neal & Jay Walker - Waco, Texas
College World Series
Karl Ravech or Jon Sciambi or Mike Patrick, Kyle Peterson, & Jenn Brown - Afternoons
Mike Patrick, Nomar Garciaparra or Orel Hershiser, & Jessica Mendoza - Evenings

Super Regionals
Mike Patrick, Nomar Garciaparra, & Jessica Mendoza - Tallahassee, Florida
Mark Neely & Danny Kanell - Columbia, South Carolina
Clay Matvick, Kyle Peterson, & Jenn Brown - Los Angeles, California
Adam Amin & Paul Lo Duca - Eugene, Oregon
College World Series Championship
Mike Patrick, Orel Hershiser, Kyle Peterson, Jenn Brown, & Jessica Mendoza

References

NCAA Division I Baseball Championship
Tournament
Baseball in Houston
Baseball in Waco, Texas